Benzyl iodide is an organic compound with the chemical formula . The compound consists of a benzene ring with an attached iodidemethyl group. The substance is an alkyl halide and is a constitutional isomer of the iodotoluenes.

Synthesis
Benzyl iodide can be obtained via the Finkelstein reaction from benzyl chloride and sodium iodide in acetone.

Properties
Benzyl iodide forms colorless to yellow needles, melting at 24.5 °C. As a liquid, the compound has the high refractive index of 1.6334. Benzyl iodide is also a powerful lachrymator.

See also 
 Benzyl bromide
 Benzyl chloride
 Benzyl fluoride

References

Organoiodides
Benzyl compounds
Lachrymatory agents